Tchicaya is a surname and may refer to:

Tchicaya U Tam'si (1931–1988), Congolese author, born Gérald-Félix Tchicaya
Jean-Félix Tchicaya, Congolese politician in the French colony of Middle Congo
Jean-Pierre Thystère Tchicaya (1936–2008), Congolese politician
Thibault Tchicaya (born 1983), Gabon international footballer

See also
Tchicaya U Tam'si Prize for African Poetry, established in 1989
Chaya (disambiguation)
Chica (disambiguation)